Sequenza XI for solo guitar (1987–1988) is one of a series of Sequenzas by Luciano Berio. Written for the American guitarist Eliot Fisk, it is an innovative investigation into the dramatic and virtuosic possibilities of musical performance.

Form
The composition is in four large sections, and sets out from the six pitches of the open strings of the guitar. The composer asserted that two intervals are important elements in the work: the perfect fourth (which is the interval found between most neighbouring pairs of the guitar's strings) and the tritone, which leads to a different harmony of Berio's devising.

Usage
Sequenza XI is a standard work for guitarists who have chosen avant-garde modern classical music as a part of their repertoire, e.g., Denis Sung-Hô (performed Sequenzas with members of the ensemble intercontemporain), Stefan Östersjö, Todd Seelye, Mats Scheidegger, Geoffrey Morris, Pablo Gómez, Pablo Márquez, Alan Thomas, Jürgen Ruck, Nico Couck, etc.: it has been recorded numerous times (see below).

Berio's Chemins V (1992) is a work for guitar and ensemble based on Sequenza XI.

References

Sources

External links

 
 A Polyphonic Mode of Listening: Luciano Berio’s 'Sequenza XI' for Guitar (2003 thesis by Mark David Porcaro. Archive from 24 March 2012)
 Berio's Sequenzas edited by Janet K. Halfyard
 "Berio’s Sequenza XI for guitar by Yiorgos Vassilandonakis

Performances
Sequenza XI (mp3) by Karim Samah
Sequenza XI by Pablo Márquez
Sequenza XI (mp3.zip) by Giulio Tampalini
Sequenza XI by Pablo Sáinz Villegas (video flv)
 by Nico Couck

Recordings
Short Sounds (2001, nosag records) by Magnus Andersson
"The 20th Century Guitar" (2009) by Harold Gretton
"Hexade, six tributes to guitar music of our epoch" (2001, CD's Audio production by Karim Samah
"The complete Sequenzas" (2006, Mode Records) by Seth Josel
"Push" (2000, Gale Recordings by Michael Nicolella
"New Dutch Guitar Music" (2006, Cybele) by Diangelo Cicilia
"Contemporary Guitar" (1997, Antes Concerto editions) by Giulio Tampalini
"Evolución" (1999, Acoustic Music Records) by Jens Wagner
"Canzoni – Italian Music for Guitar" by Franz Halasz
"Sequenza" by Njål Vindenes
"Berio: Sequenzas I–XIV by Pablo Sáinz Villegas
"Sequenza!" (exact same as in compilation Berio Sequenzas) by Eliot Fisk
"Sheer Pluck" by Todd Seelye
"Robot Dream" by Peter Yates

Compositions by Luciano Berio
1988 compositions
Compositions for guitar
Contemporary classical compositions

Compositions that use extended techniques